Greatest Hits Volume One (or variants) may refer to:

 Greatest Hits Volume I (Barry Manilow album), 1989
 Greatest Hits Volume 1 (Beatles album), 1966
 Greatest Hits Volume One (Billy "Crash" Craddock album), 1974
 Greatest Hits, Vol. 1 (Blue Rodeo album), 2001
 Greatest Hits Volume 1 (Cockney Rejects album), 1980
 Greatest Hits, Vol. 1 (Doug Stone album), 1994
 Greatest Hits, Vol. 1 (Flaming Lips album), 2018
 Greatest Hits, Vol. 1 (Johnny Cash album), 1967
 Greatest Hits, Vol. 1 (Korn album), 2004
 Greatest Hits Volume One (Mando Diao album), 2012
 Greatest Hits, Vol. 1 (New Edition album), 1991
 Greatest Hits, Vol. 1 (Nicky Jam album), 2014
 Greatest Hits, Volume 1 (Randy Travis album), 1992
 Greatest Hits Volume 1 (Rascal Flatts album), 2008
 Greatest Hits, Vol. 1 (Ray Stevens album), 1987
 Greatest Hits, Vol. 1 (Rod Stewart album), 1979
 Greatest Hits, Vol. 1 (Phil Vassar album), 2006
 Greatest Hits: Volume One (The Bob & Tom Show album), 1999
 Greatest Hits Volume One (Toby Keith album), 1998
 Greatest Hits, Vol. 1: The Player Years, 1983–1988, a 1993 album by Too Short
 The Greatest Hits – Volume 1: 20 Good Vibrations, a 1995 album by The Beach Boys
 Greatest Hits, Vol. 1 (Rare Essence album)
 Greatest Hits Vol. 1 (Mental As Anything album), 1986

See also
List of greatest hits albums
Greatest hits
 Greatest Hits Volume Two (disambiguation)
 Greatest Hits Volume Three (disambiguation)

Greatest Hits Volume 1